Tipaimukh Dam is a proposed embankment dam on the river Barak in Manipur state India, first commissioned in 1983. The purpose of the dam is flood control and hydroelectric power generation. It has been subject to repeated delays as the project developed, as there has been controversy between India and Bangladesh over water rights, in addition to questions of environmental effects of the huge project, as well as the need to relocate indigenous Hmar people to make way for a vast reservoir. In 2013, the governments of India and Bangladesh announced further delays, as the latter nation undertakes additional studies about expected effects and mitigating measures.

Technical features
The dam is planned to be 390m long and 162.8m high, across the Barak River, which enters Bangladesh below the proposed dam location. The dam's crest elevation will be at an altitude of about 180 m. above mean sea level, with a maximum reservoir level of 178 m. The dam was originally designed for flood control, to contain waters in the lower Barak valley. Hydro-power generation was later incorporated into the project. The project will have an installation capacity of 1500 MW, supplied by six 250 MW Francis turbine-generators.

Controversies
Bangladeshi experts have said the massive dam will disrupt the seasonal rhythm of the river and have an adverse effect on downstream agriculture and fisheries. The government of Bangladesh has decided to send an expert team to the dam area to examine the features and likely impact of the dam on the flow of water into the Surma and the Kushiara.

Another is the environmental factor. The Tipaimukh area lies in an ecologically sensitive and topographically fragile region. It is within one of the most seismically volatile regions on the planet. A major earthquake of magnitude of 6.6 on the Richter Scale rocked Manipur-Myanmar border on 6 August 1988 at the epicenter of lat.

In 2013 the two governments announced up to a 2-year delay, to allow Bangladesh to complete additional environmental studies.

References

External links

Tipaimukh Project, NHPC
Gowher Rizvi"Tipaimukh: A plea for rational and scientific discussion", Daily Star - 
Md. Khalequzzaman, "Impact of Tipai Dam on the haor regions", Daily Star

Hydroelectric power stations in Manipur
Proposed hydroelectric power stations
Proposed dams in India
Dam controversies
Dams in Manipur
Embankment dams
Proposed renewable energy power stations in India